Olivia Gentile is an American author. Her first book, Life List, was published in 2009 and tells the true story of Phoebe Snetsinger, a housewife and cancer survivor from St. Louis who saw more bird species than anyone else in history.

Background and education
Gentile grew up in Washington, D.C., attending Sidwell Friends School, and graduated from Harvard in 1996. She earned an M.F.A. in nonfiction writing from Columbia in 2003.

She was a reporter for The Hartford Courant (1999–2001) and The Rutland Herald (1996–1999). Gentile supported herself while writing Life List by working as a part-time assistant to a federal judge in Brooklyn, the Hon. Raymond J. Dearie.

Personal
In January 2008, Gentile married Andy Borowitz, the comedian and writer whose main outlet is the popular website The Borowitz Report. They live in New York City but spend much of their time upstate, in the rural Hudson Valley.

Reviews of Life List
In a prepublication review, the scientist and author of Guns, Germs, and Steel, Jared Diamond, wrote of Life List,

On April 15, 2009, Life List was favorably reviewed in The Christian Science Monitor: "That Snetsinger flew the coop was both a point of pride and a point of friction for her family, and Gentile does not cast judgment but simply describes what she sees. By documenting the tension between the obligation to others and the obligation to oneself, Gentile has written a book as much about the life of women as about a woman’s life.”

References

1974 births
Living people
Harvard University alumni
Columbia University School of the Arts alumni
American non-fiction writers
Sidwell Friends School alumni
American women non-fiction writers
21st-century American women